The Diocese of Oakland is a Latin Church ecclesiastical territory or diocese of the Catholic Church in Northern California. The diocese comprises Alameda and Contra Costa Counties in the San Francisco Bay Area. The Cathedral of Christ the Light serves as the bishop's seat, replacing the Cathedral of Saint Francis de Sales which was demolished after the Loma Prieta earthquake of 1989.

Once a part of the Archdiocese of San Francisco, the Diocese of Oakland remains a suffragan diocese in the ecclesiastical province governed by the metropolitan Archbishop of San Francisco. Its fellow suffragans include the dioceses of Honolulu, Las Vegas, Reno, Sacramento, Salt Lake City, San Jose, Santa Rosa and Stockton.

The patron saints of the Diocese of Oakland are Mary, Queen of the World and Saint Francis de Sales.

History

The first known Mass celebrated in the area that would become the Diocese of Oakland was on March 27, 1772, by Father Juan Crespí on the shores of Lake Merritt. Twenty five years later, Mission San José was established in what is now Fremont, becoming the first parish in the area. Within time, Mission San José became the most prosperous of the California Missions. After secularization by the Mexican government the mission remained an integral part of the area with many of the early pioneer families sharing close ties with the mission.

In the 1820s the Peralta family, landowners of much of what would become Alameda County, built a chapel on the grounds of Rancho San Antonio in present-day Oakland. The chapel was served by priests from the mission and was called Saint Anthony's chapel.

The area came under episcopal control in 1840 with the establishment of the Diocese of the Two Californians. After the Mexican–American War in 1850, the diocese was split in two with the Diocese of Monterey in California administering the areas under American control. In 1853 Joseph Sadoc Alemany, the Bishop of Monterey, moved his seat to San Francisco and became the first Archbishop of San Francisco. At that time Mission San José was the only parish in the East Bay.

In 1858, Archbishop Alemany sent Father James Croke to establish a parish in Oakland. Croke founded St. Mary, Immaculate Conception at Eighth and Jefferson Streets.

By the turn of the twentieth century many parishes were formed in Berkeley, Fremont, Livermore, Hayward, Oakland, and San Leandro to reflect the growing populations in the East Bay. After World War II rapid growth in the San Francisco region led Pope John XXIII to establish the Diocese of Oakland in 1962 from the eastern portion of the San Francisco Archdiocese. Saint Frances de Sales was established as the diocesan mother church and Floyd Begin of Cleveland, Ohio, was installed as Oakland's first bishop.

In the following decades the Cathedral of Saint Francis de Sales developed a national reputation for lively liturgies and for social ministries. The cathedral parish was also known for its excellence in music, developing what was called the "Oakland Cathedral Sound". Unfortunately, the cathedral church suffered damage in the 1989 Loma Prieta earthquake. The diocese deemed the repairs too costly (estimates were at $8 million for both the Cathedral and Sacred Heart Church) and instead opted to demolish the churches.

In May 2005, ground was broken for the new $131 million Cathedral of Christ the Light, located on the shores of Lake Merritt in Oakland. The new cathedral opened in 2008 with a new parish formed out of the then cathedral parish of Saint Mary-Saint Francis de Sales.

In May 2020, it was revealed that the Diocese of Oakland was undergoing a sex abuse lawsuit. In July 2020, the Rev. Varghese "George" Alengadan, who had been placed on administrative leave five months earlier, was charged with committing sexual battery against a woman in 2019.

Present
Today, the Diocese of Oakland serves an estimated 560,000 Catholics in the East Bay region. There are currently 84 parishes located in the diocese and 16 pastoral centers. As the Bay Area is known for a diverse population, the diocese celebrates Mass in 15 different languages including Spanish, American Sign Language, Vietnamese, Filipino, and Latin (Mass of Paul VI and Tridentine Mass).

The diocesan Department of Catholic Schools administers over forty-seven elementary/middle schools and nine high schools serving over 19,000 students. Some of the more notable schools include De La Salle High School, known nationally as a football powerhouse, St. Joseph Notre Dame High School in Alameda, known as having state championship basketball teams, Bishop O'Dowd High School, and Salesian College Preparatory.

In addition to the elementary and high schools, seven universities and seminaries are located within the Diocese of Oakland, including:
Graduate Theological Union Affiliates
Dominican School of Philosophy and Theology
Franciscan School of Theology
Jesuit School of Theology at Berkeley
The School of Applied Theology
St. Mary's College of California
Holy Names University
 Queen of the Holy Rosary College (Community College)

Bishops

Bishops of Oakland
The list of bishops of the diocese and their terms of service:
 Floyd Lawrence Begin (1962–1977)
 John Stephen Cummins (1977–2003)
 Allen Henry Vigneron (2003–2009), appointed Archbishop of Detroit
 Salvatore Cordileone (2009–2012), appointed Archbishop of San Francisco
 Michael C. Barber, S.J. (2013–present)

Other priest of this diocese who became a bishop
 Clarence Richard Silva, appointed Bishop of Honolulu in 2005

Churches

High schools

For boys
 De La Salle High School (1965) Concord

For girls
 Carondelet High School (1965) Concord
 Holy Names High School (1868) Oakland

Coeducational
 Bishop O'Dowd High School (1951) Oakland
 Moreau Catholic High School (1965) Hayward
 St. Joseph Notre Dame High School (1881) Alameda
 Saint Mary's College High School (1863, San Francisco) Berkeley
 Salesian College Preparatory (1960) Richmond

Closed Schools
 St. Elizabeth High School (1912) Oakland

Grade schools
 St. Joseph, Alameda
 St. Philip Neri, Alameda
 Holy Rosary, Antioch
 School of the Madeleine, Berkeley
 Our Lady of Grace, Castro Valley
 St. Agnes, Concord
 St. Francis of Assisi, Concord
 Queen of All Saints, Concord
 St. Isidore, Danville
 St. Raymond, Dublin
 St. John the Baptist, El Cerrito
 Holy Spirit, Fremont
 St. Joseph, Fremont
 Our Lady of Guadalupe, Fremont
 Dominican Kindergarten, Fremont
 All Saints, Hayward
 St. Bede, Hayward
 St. Clement, Hayward
 St. Joachim, Hayward
 St. Perpetua, Lafayette
 St. Michael, Livermore
 St. Catherine of Siena, Martinez
 St. Edward, Newark
 St. Anthony, Oakland
 St. Elizabeth, Oakland
 St. Jarlath, Oakland
 St. Lawrence O'Toole, Oakland
 St. Leo, Oakland
 St. Martin de Porres, Oakland
 St. Theresa, Oakland
 Corpus Christi, Piedmont
 St. Peter Martyr, Pittsburg
 Christ the King, Pleasant Hill
 St. Cornelius, Richmond
 St. David, Richmond
 St. Patrick, Rodeo
 Assumption, San Leandro
 St. Felicitas, San Leandro
 St. Leander, San Leandro
 St. John, San Lorenzo
 St. Paul, San Pablo
 Our Lady of the Rosary, Union City
 St. Mary, Walnut Creek

Publications
The Diocese of Oakland publishes The Catholic Voice, its official newspaper, on a semi-monthly basis.

Sexual Abuse scandals

The diocese has suffered from Catholic sex abuse cases which were brought forward by parishioners against some of its priests. From 1994 through 2009, the diocese paid $60.5 million to its victims of sexual abuse, the largest payments being made in 2004 and 2005. In August 2005, it was confirmed that the Diocese already paid $56 million to settle lawsuits with 56 victims of clergy sex abuse, with $200,000 to more than $2 million

At least 64 Roman Catholic clergy members accused of molesting children have served in 61 of the 86 parishes in the Oakland diocese, and in all seven of the diocese's male-run high schools. The Diocese has only acknowledged 12 of the molesters, according to a 2008 MediaNews analysis of court and church records.

Nine diocesan clergy have been accused of molesting four or more children each, according to Dan McNevin of Survivors Network of those Abused by Priests (SNAP), and court records. Monsignor Vincent Breen was accused of abusing at least fifteen girls, and Monsignor George Francis nine girls. The Reverend James Clark was accused of abusing four children, the Reverend Arthur Ribeiro four, the Reverend Robert Freitas five, the Reverend Gary Tollner six, the Reverend Robert Ponciroli eight, the Reverend Donald Broderson eleven, and the Reverend Stephen Kiesle fifteen. One of the victims, Linda Chapin, was awarded $3 million in a 2004 settlement reached with the diocese, related to her accusation that George Francis raped her "ritualistically and sadistically" several times beginning when she was six years old. Francis died in 1998. Upon winning her settlement, Chapin called upon the diocese to "name all the priests that there are credible allegations against."

In 2005, Tim Stier, priest at the Corpus Christi Catholic Church in Fremont, California, stepped down from his 25-year service with the Oakland diocese in protest at its failure to address sexuality problems in priests. Stier described the diocese as hiding or ignoring the child sex abuse cases, and not holding its leaders accountable. He said, "It's not as if I'm a perfect person and I don't have weaknesses and sin. But there is a level of dishonesty and arrogance in this that just tells me we need systemic, radical change."  Stier has since endorsed such innovations as female priests, married priests, openly gay priests and married gay priests.

In 2010, Stephen Kiesle was accused of abusing an 11-year-old girl, Teresa Rosson, from 1972, the year he was ordained, until 2001, two decades after he had been removed from the priesthood. Kiesle married Rosson's mother in 1982.  In 1978, Kiesle had pleaded no contest to a misdemeanor charge of lewd conduct for tying up and molesting two boys in a church rectory and was removed from his duties as a priest.  From 1985 to 1988, Kiesle volunteered as a youth minister in a parish in Pinole, but was removed after a worker in the Diocese's Office of Youth Ministry complained.  Kiesle was formally defrocked in 1987.  Eight of Kiesle's victims settled with the Diocese in 2005 for between $1 million and $1.5 million each, part of a total of $56 million in settlements paid out by the Diocese that year to those who had been abused, and more than a quarter of a million in therapy for victims. Diocese-owned insurance policies covered some 57% of these payments. Kiesle was sentenced to six years in prison; some of the charges were dropped because they were beyond the legal statute of limitations. He was returned to prison for four months for possessing pornography in violation of his parole.

In October 2008, Bishop Allen Henry Vigneron opened a Healing Garden at the Cathedral of Christ the Light, dedicated to victims of clergy sexual abuse. From 1994 through 2009, the diocese paid $60.5 million to its victims of sexual abuse.

In April 2012, the Catholic News Agency (CNA), in an online news story article with EWTN News, stated that the California Supreme Court, in an opinion written by California's Chief Justice, Tani Cantil-Sakauye, ruled that a one-year extension that had run out on the expired statute of limitations prevented six brothers of the Quarry family from suing the archdiocese over early 1970s molestation cases, in which the defendant was removed from the priesthood (1990s) and is deceased (2010), given that the claim is now too stale to be adequately defended against because of degradation in evidence.

In December 2020, the Diocese of Oakland paid $3.5 million to settle a lawsuit brought by a former seminarian who claimed he was raped by a Livermore priest back in 2017.

See also

 Catholic Church by country
 Catholic Church in the United States
 Ecclesiastical Province of San Francisco
 Global organisation of the Catholic Church
 List of Roman Catholic archdioceses (by country and continent)
 List of Roman Catholic dioceses (alphabetical) (including archdioceses)
 List of Roman Catholic dioceses (structured view) (including archdioceses)
 List of the Catholic dioceses of the United States

References

External links
Roman Catholic Diocese of Oakland Official Site
The Cathedral of Christ the Light Official Website
Burns, Jeffrey M. and Batiza, Mary C. We Are The Church: The History Of The Diocese Of Oakland - 2001, Published by the Diocese of Oakland.
Official 2009 Catholic Directory of the Diocese of Oakland, Published by the Catholic Voice.

 
Oakland
Christian organizations established in 1962
Roman Catholic dioceses and prelatures established in the 20th century
Roman Catholic Ecclesiastical Province of San Francisco
Roman Catholic dioceses in the United States
1962 establishments in California